Jakarnaval is an annual cultural nuance parade organized by the DKI Jakarta Provincial Government which is arranged as part of commemoration of the anniversary of Jakarta in Indonesia.Anniversary of Jakarta is celebrated by arranging various program throughout the month of June every year, such as Jakarta Fair, Jakarta Night Festival,  Kota Tua Creative Festival etc. 

Jakarnaval is a flagship activity of celebration of anniversary of Jakarta, usually held at venues centered around Merdeka Square, Jakarta. Jakarnaval has been included in the Indonesian Ministry of Tourism's annual calendar of tourism events. The carnival always gets great interest from both the community and special actors of arts and culture. It usually displays an art parade followed by a float parade. The carnival parade displays different community and cultures of Indonesia. Some foreign embassies based in Jakarta also participate the Jakarnaval parade to represent respective countries culture.

References

Carnivals in Indonesia
Annual events in Indonesia
Events in Jakarta